Xanthoconite is a sulfosalt mineral with the chemical formula Ag3AsS3.

References

Sulfosalt minerals
Silver minerals
Monoclinic minerals
Minerals in space group 15
Minerals described in 1840